Sergio Henrique Francisco, simply known as Serginho (born 19 December 1984), is a Brazilian professional footballer.

Club career
Born in Avaré, Serginho made his senior debuts with local Linense, and went on to appear several years for the side. In January 2009 he moved abroad, joining Angolan Girabola side Recreativo do Libolo.

In November Serginho returned to his homeland, joining Guaratinguetá, and featuring as a regular starter. A year later he moved to neighbouring Mirassol, but was sparingly used in the league (despite being a starter during the state leagues) and joined Red Bull Brasil. In December Serginho signed with Brasiliense, but appeared only once for the club.

In May, Serginho moved to Boa Esporte, but served mainly as a backup. In February he joined Araxá, but later moved back to his home state and joined Mogi Mirim.

On 16 May 2014 Serginho was presented at Portuguesa. On 22 December, however, he returned to his first club Linense.

References

External links

UOL Esporte profile 
Serginho at playmakerstats.com (English version of ogol.com.br)

1984 births
Living people
Brazilian footballers
Association football forwards
Campeonato Brasileiro Série B players
Campeonato Brasileiro Série C players
Campeonato Brasileiro Série D players
Clube Atlético Linense players
Guaratinguetá Futebol players
Mirassol Futebol Clube players
Boa Esporte Clube players
Brasiliense Futebol Clube players
Mogi Mirim Esporte Clube players
Associação Portuguesa de Desportos players
Botafogo Futebol Clube (SP) players
C.D. Jorge Wilstermann players
Brazilian expatriate footballers
Brazilian expatriate sportspeople in Angola
Expatriate footballers in Angola
Expatriate footballers in Bolivia